India hosted the 2010 Commonwealth Games which were held in Delhi from 3 to 14 October 2010. India won 101 medals in total, including 38 Gold medals, enabling it to finish the Games at second position behind Australia. For the first time in the history of the Games India won over 100 medals in total. For the first time in the history of the Games, India won a medal in Gymnastics, where Ashish Kumar won a Silver and a Bronze. And it was after a gap of 52 years that India won a Gold in Athletics when Krishna Poonia won Gold in Women's discus throw and when Geeta Phogat won India's first ever gold medal in women's wrestling.

Medalists
India won the most medals in their home games. India won 30 medals in shooting including 14 Gold medals and won 19 medals (10 are Gold medals) from wrestling out of all 21 participants.

Archery

India sent 12 archers to the 2010 commonwealth games Delhi.

Men

Women

Athletics

116 Indian athletes took part in track and field and won twelve medals.

Men's track

Men's field

Women's track

Women's field

Paralympic athletics

Badminton

Men

Women

Mixed

Boxing

India won seven medals including three gold medals.
Men

Diving

India selected a team to the Games:

Men

Women

Gymnastics

India selected gymnasts to the Games.

Men's artistic
Team

Individual

Women
Team

Individual

Rhythmic

Field Hockey

Men
 Sandeep Singh
 Arjun Halappa
 Prabhjot Singh
 Sardara Singh
 Gurwinder Singh Chandi
 Deepak Thakur
 Sarwanjit Singh
 Gurbaj Singh
 Tushar Khandker
 Rajpal Singh (captain)
 Sreejesh Ravindran
 Shivendra Singh
 Bharat Chikara
 Dhananjay Mahadik
 Vikram Pillay
 Danish Mujtaba
 Coach:- Jose Brasa 
India has been drawn into Group A with Australia, Pakistan, Malaysia and Scotland.

Pool A

First to fourth place classification

Semi-finals

Gold medal match

Women
 Binita Toppo
 Subhadra Pradhan
 Joydeep Kaur
 Asunta Lakra
 Kirandeep Kaur
 Mukta Prava Barla
 Deepika Thakur
 Ritu Rani
 Surinder Kaur (captain)
 Saba Anjum
 Rani Rampal
 Jasjeet Kaur Handa
 Thokcham Chanchan Devi
 Poonam Rani
 Dipika Murty
 Rajani Etimarpu

Pool A

Lawn Bowls

Men

Women

Netball

22 members squad for 2010 Commonwealth Games has been declared.
 Megha Chaudhary
 Prachi Tehlan (captain)
 Ramandeep Kaur
 Neha Bajaj
 Priya Dahiya
 Mainisha Rathore
 Punam Kumari
 Santosh Jakhar
 Shireen Limaye
 Kavitha Kavitha
 Indu Panwar
 Bobby Bobby
 Padma Padma
 Neha Lakhera
 Neha Kansal
 Amanjit Kaur
 Rupinder Kaur
 Deepali Sharma
 Preeti Banchor
 Kiranjit Kaur
 Harminder Kaur
 Leela H.S.
India is drawn in Pool A

Pool A
 Goal percentage (G%) = 100 × GF/GA. Accurate to one decimal place.
 Teams that are highlighted after the completion of pool matches advance to the medal playoffs.

Rugby Sevens

Men
 Nasser Hussain
 Hrishikesh Pendse
 Rohaan Sethna
 Kayrus Unwala
 Pritom Roy
 Gautam Dagar
 Deepak Dagar
 Kamaldeep Dagar
 Amit Lochab
 Jagga Singh
 Sailen Tudu
 Thimmaiah Mandanda
 Dinesh Kumar Ravi Kumar
 Bikash Jena
 Surinder Singh
 Sukhdeep Singh
 Rohit Sivach
 Dalwinder Singh
 Sujai Lama
 Puneet Krishnamoorthy
 Roshan Lobo
India is in Pool B

Group B

Shooting

India topped the medal table in shooting

Men

Women

Squash

India's squash team will consist of 10 athletes (5 men and 5 Women).

Men

Women

Swimming

India's swimming team consisted of 20 swimmers.

Men

Women

Paralympic swimming

Synchronized swimming

India competed in synchronized swimming at the 2010 Games.

Table tennis

India's table tennis team consisted of 10 athletes and 4 reserves

Men

Women

Teams

Tennis

India will selected top stars such as Leander Paes and Mahesh Bhupathi

Men

Women

Mixed

Weightlifting

Men

Women

Powerlifting

Wrestling

Indian wrestling team consists of 21 wrestlers.

Men's Freestyle

Women's Freestyle

Greco-Roman

References

2010
Nations at the 2010 Commonwealth Games
Commonwealth Games